Margaret Catharine Rodgers (born August 13, 1964), known professionally as M. Casey Rodgers, is a United States district judge of the United States District Court for the Northern District of Florida.

Education and career

Born in Pensacola, Florida, Rodgers was in the United States Army from 1985 to 1987, and thereafter received a Bachelor of Arts degree from the University of West Florida in 1989 and a Juris Doctor from California Western School of Law, an independent law school,  in 1992. She was a law clerk for Judge Lacey A. Collier, U.S. District Court for the Northern District of Florida from 1992 to 1994. She was in private practice in Pensacola from 1999 to 2002, serving as general counsel to the West Florida Medical Center, in Pensacola from 1998 to 1999. She was a United States magistrate judge of the United States District Court for the Northern District of Florida, from 2002 to 2003.

Federal judicial service

On July 14, 2003, Rodgers was nominated by President George W. Bush to a seat on the United States District Court for the Northern District of Florida vacated by Lacey A. Collier. Rodgers was confirmed by the United States Senate on October 20, 2003, and received her commission on November 21, 2003. She was the first woman appointed in the district's history. She served as Chief Judge from 2011 to 2018.

References

Sources

1964 births
Living people
Judges of the United States District Court for the Northern District of Florida
United States district court judges appointed by George W. Bush
21st-century American judges
University of West Florida alumni
California Western School of Law alumni
United States Army soldiers
Female United States Army personnel
United States magistrate judges
People from Pensacola, Florida
21st-century American women judges